Tower of London was a London Underground station in the City of London that closed in 1884, only two years after opening. It was situated near the Tower of London, on a site now occupied by Tower Hill Underground station.

It was opened on 25 September 1882 during the construction of the Metropolitan Railway (MR) to the north. Two years later, the MR and District Railway (now the District line) were connected to form the Inner Circle (now the Circle line) and a new station was built. This new station was opened on 6 October 1884 with the name Mark Lane (later renamed Tower Hill), just to the west of the Tower of London station, which closed on 12 October.

When the original Tower Hill station was itself closed in 1967, the current Tower Hill station was opened on the site of the closed Tower of London station. The remains of the Tower of London station were demolished during the construction of the new Tower Hill station.

References

Notes

Bibliography

Former buildings and structures in the London Borough of Tower Hamlets
Disused railway stations in the London Borough of Tower Hamlets
Disused London Underground stations
Former Metropolitan Railway stations
Railway stations in Great Britain opened in 1882
Railway stations in Great Britain closed in 1884
Tower of London